Sankata Prasad also spelt Sankta Prasad  was an Indian politician. He was a Member of Parliament, representing Uttar Pradesh in the Rajya Sabha, the upper house of India's Parliament representing the Indian National Congress.

References

External links
Official biographical sketch in Parliament of India website

Rajya Sabha members from Uttar Pradesh
Indian National Congress politicians
1927 births
1992 deaths